One Kind Favor is B.B. King's 42nd and final studio album. Produced by T Bone Burnett, it was released on August 26, 2008, by Geffen Records.

The album won the Grammy Award for Best Traditional Blues Album at the 51st Grammy Awards.

Reception

Rolling Stone called it "one of the strongest studio sets of his career, standing alongside classics such as Singin' the Blues and Lucille." Both Rolling Stone and AllMusic commented on the stripped-down sound and lack of guest appearances which was departure in style from King's recent previous albums. Both credited T Bone Burnett for the shift in sound and praised him for his production. Bud Scoppa of Paste Magazine commented "Elegiac by intent, the record is awash in poignancy, radiating from the deeply felt guitar and vocal performances of the 83-year-old King and his supporting band... and from the carefully chosen material. But just as importantly, it boasts a breathtaking immediacy."

A reviewer of The New Yorker stated "All in all, it’s a bracing, gratifying reminder of why King is in the pantheon." Milo Miles of NPR commented "One Kind Favor stands alone, however, in reaffirming King's unique power as a star and venerable performer. More than any other icon, King is about the music and not himself. After all, he is large and contains multitudes of blues." Woodrow Wiklins of All About Jazz wrote "King has entertained millions with his albums, concerts and television appearances. He has won several Grammy Awards. Some are on display at his museum, which is built around an old cotton gin building where King worked as a young man. And with this release, the King of Blues has done his fans One Kind Favor."

Track listing

Personnel
B.B. King - vocals, guitar
Dr. John - piano
Nathan East - bass guitar
Mike Elizondo - bass guitar, double bass
Jim Keltner - drums, percussion
Jay Bellerose - drums, percussion
Snooky Young - trumpet
Ricky Woodard - tenor sax
Ernie Fields Jr. - baritone saxophone
Jeffrey Clayton - alto saxophone
Neil Larsen - Hammond organ
Darrell Leonard - trumpet, arranger, horn Arrangements
Ira Nepus - trombone
Charles Owens II - tenor saxophone
Johnny Lee Schell - guitar

References

External links
 

2008 albums
B.B. King albums
Albums produced by T Bone Burnett
Geffen Records albums
Grammy Award for Best Traditional Blues Album